was a samurai from Saga domain. He later became a chamberlain and later a governor for Akita Prefecture.

References

External links
 Yoshitake SHIMA
 

Samurai
Nabeshima retainers
1822 births
1874 deaths